The Senate of Pakistan or Aiwān-e-Bālā Pākistān (literally "Pakistan upper house"), constitutionally House of the Federation is the upper legislative chamber of the bicameral parliament of Pakistan. As of 2023, It has a total of 100 seats, of which 92 are elected by the provincial legislatures of Pakistan, with equal representation of 23 seats for all provinces, using indirect single transferable votes, while 4 represent the Federal Capital and the remaining 4 are representing FATA, until membership expiration in 2024. Elections are held every three years for one half of the house, each Senator has a term of six years. Unlike the National Assembly, the Senate is a continuing chamber and hence not subject to dissolution.

First convened in 1973, the Senate's composition and powers are established by the Article 59 of the Constitution of Pakistan. Each of the four provinces are represented by 23 senators regardless of population, while the Islamabad Capital Territory is represented by four senators, all of whom serve staggered six-year terms. The Senate secretariat is located in the east wing of the Parliament Building; the National Assembly convenes in the west wing of the same building.

The Senate has several exclusive powers not granted to the National Assembly, including the powers of making parliamentary bills as a being enforced into law. Elections are held every three years for one half of the Senate and each Senator has a term of six years. The Constitution does not allow for the dissolution of the Senate.

History 

After Independence, the first Constituent Assembly of Pakistan, elected in December 1947 after partition, was assigned the task of framing the Constitution of Pakistan. This Assembly passed the Objectives Resolution on 12 March 1949, laying down principles which later became a substantive part of the Constitution of Pakistan. However, before it could accomplish the task of framing the constitution, it was dissolved in October 1954. Thereafter, the Governor General, convened the Second Constituent Assembly in May 1955, which framed and passed the first Constitution of Pakistan on 29 February 1956. That Constitution was promulgated on 23 March 1956, which provided for a parliamentary form of Government with a unicameral legislature. However, from 14 August 1947 to 1 March 1956, the Government of India Act 1935 was retained as the Constitution of Pakistan.

On October 7, 1958, Martial Law was promulgated and the Constitution abrogated. The Military Government appointed a Constitution Commission in February, 1960 which framed the 1962 Constitution. That Constitution provided for a Presidential form of Government with a unicameral legislature. The 1962 Constitution was abrogated on 25 March 1969. The Civil Government, which came to power in December 1971 pursuant to 1970 elections, gave the nation an interim Constitution in the year 1972.

The 1970 Assembly framed the 1973 Constitution which was unanimously passed on 12 April and promulgated on 14 August 1973. The 1973 Constitution provides for a parliamentary form of Government with a bicameral legislature, comprising the National Assembly and the Senate.

The membership of the Senate, which was originally 45, was raised to 63 in 1977 and to 87 in 1985. The government of Gen. Pervez Musharraf raised the membership of the Senate from 87 to 100 through the Legal Framework Order (LFO), 2002, enforced on 21 August 2002 and the government of Asif Ali Zardari raised the membership of the Senate from 100 to 104 through the 18th amendment in 2011 (four minority members from four provinces). After the Twenty-Fifth Amendment, the number of seats in the Senate was reduced to 96, as the seats for FATA were removed after its merger with KPK.

Purpose and role 
The main purpose for the creation of the Senate of Pakistan was to give equal representation to all the federating units since the membership of the National Assembly was based on the population of each province. Equal provincial membership in the Senate, thus, balances the provincial inequality in the National Assembly.

There are one hundred senatorial seats. There are 18 women Senators; Pakistani constitution requires that there be at least 17 women Senators. Members of the Senate are elected according to Article 59 of the Constitution.

President and Parliament
Under Article 50 of the Constitution, the Majlis-i-Shoora (Parliament) of Pakistan consists of the President and two Houses to be known respectively as the National Assembly and the Senate. The President is elected by members of both Houses of the Parliament and the Provincial Assemblies. The President may be removed from office or impeached through a resolution, passed by not less than two-thirds of the total membership of the Parliament in a joint sitting of the two Houses, convened for the purpose. 
In the event that the office of the President becomes vacant, the Chairman of the Senate acts as President till such time that the position may be filled through a by election. This also occurs when the President, by reason of absence or any other incapacity, is unable to effectively exercise their office.

Relations between the Houses
Unless both the Houses pass a Bill and it receives President's assent it cannot become a law including in the case of a money bill which is the sole prerogative of the National Assembly. Through an amendment, the role of a Mediation Committee, composed of eight members of each House, has been introduced to evolve consensus on Bills, in case there is a disagreement between the two houses.

Cabinet
The Constitution provides that there shall be a Cabinet headed by the Prime Minister which is collectively responsible to the National Assembly. The Prime Minister is chosen from the National Assembly. The Federal Ministers and Ministers of State are appointed from among the members of Parliament. However, the number of Federal Ministers and Ministers of State who are members of Senate, shall not at any time, exceed one fourth of the numbers of Federal Ministers.

List of senates

Composition

 FATA merged with Khyber Pakhtunkhwa through 25th amendment. The amendment reduces the members in Senate from 104 to 100 in 2021 and ultimately to 96 in 2024. Current members representing FATA will continue to serve till 2024 (half retired in 2021). After 2024, FATA will have no separate Senators.
 Four seats for non-Muslims increased through the Constitution (Eighteenth Amendment) Act, 2010 (Act No. X of 2010).

Appointment
(1) The Senate shall consist of 100 members, of whom: 
(a) 14 shall be elected by the members of each Provincial Assembly;
(c) two on general seats, and one woman and one technocrat including Aalim shall be elected from the Federal Capital in such manner as the President may, by Order, and by law prescribe;
(d) four women shall be elected by the members of each Provincial Assembly;
(e) four technocrats including ulema shall be elected by the members of each Provincial Assembly.
(f) one seat in the senate is reserved for minorities in each province."
(2) Election to fill seats in the Senate allocated to each Province shall be held in accordance with the system of proportional representation by means of the single transferable vote.

(3) The Senate shall not be subject to dissolution but the term of its members of parliaments, who shall retire as follows, shall be six years:- 
(a) of the members referred to in paragraph (a) of clause (1), seven shall retire after the expiration of the first three years and seven shall retire after the expiration of the next three years.

(b) of the members referred to in paragraph (c) of the aforesaid clause,-
(i) one elected on general seat shall retire after the expiration of the first three years and the other one shall retire after the expiration of the next three years, and
(ii) one elected on the seat reserved for technocrat shall retire after first three years and the one elected on the seat reserved for woman shall retire after the expiration of the next three years;
(c) of the members referred to in paragraph (d) of the aforesaid clause, two shall retire after the expiration of the three years and two shall retire after the expiration of the next three years; and
(d) of the members referred to in paragraph (e) of the aforesaid clause, two shall retire after the expiration of the first three years and two shall retire after the expiration of the next three years: Provided that the term of office of a person elected to fill a casual vacancy shall be the unexpired term of the member whose vacancy he has filled.

Current members

See also
Chairman of the Senate of Pakistan
List of senators of Pakistan
Member of Senate of Pakistan
List of committees of the Senate of Pakistan
National Assembly of Pakistan
Government of Pakistan

References

External links 
 Senate website

 
Parliament of Pakistan
Pakistan